Conchita Montes (13 March 1914 – 18 October 1994) was a Spanish film actress.

Career
Born in Madrid, Montes became a popular actress in Spanish films of the 1940s and 1950s. In 1950 she starred in El último caballo
an Edgar Neville film in which she starred alongside Fernando Fernán Gómez.
 
However, after 1960 she mostly appeared in Spanish television until her eventual retirement in 1992. She died in 1994.

Filmography

External links
 

Spanish film actresses
Spanish television actresses
1914 births
1994 deaths
Actresses from Madrid
20th-century Spanish actresses